Daddy Cool is a musical based upon the works of Boney M. and other Frank Farian produced artists.  It premiered in the West End in 2006, followed by UK and international tours. It is currently (2017) touring Germany with excellent reviews and sold-out theatres.

The musical tells the story of Sunny, a young man who lives for his music. Caught up in local rivalry between East and West London crews, he meets and falls in love with Rose, daughter of the East End's notorious club owner Ma Baker. Echoing Romeo and Juliet, the lovers' relationship fuels the hostility between the two gangs, leaving their families face to face with past secrets and forcing them to confront their future.

Productions
Daddy Cool was originally due to open on 16 May 2006, following previews from 26 April, however this date was later put back until 2 May 2006, keeping the premiere the same, but allowing more creative time.  In March 2006, the producers Frank Farian and Robert Mackintosh (brother of Sir Cameron Mackintosh) announced that the show had been delayed indefinitely, with the earliest opening in September 2006.

The show premiered on 21 September 2006 at London's newly refurbished Shaftesbury Theatre following previews from 15 August 2006.  It closed on 17 February 2007.

A tour opened in Berlin, Germany, on 26 April 2007, where it played for two months. The show toured in Denmark during February 2009.

The UK National Tour ran from 10 to 14 June 2008 at the Aberdeen Arts Centre.

The musical has also been produced in the Netherlands (September 2011 to January 2012), Spain (July 2012), and Switzerland (November 2015 to January 2016).

Synopsis 
Act I
Sunny lives on the islands with his Grandma Ella, who receives a letter from Sunny's mother Pearl in England, telling them that she wants him home. Young Sunny is hostile towards her at first, and begins to feel the music, bursting into song during church.

Years later, Sunny is part of the Subsonics, a music crew led by Shake. At a recording session with Rasputin, they run into The Blades, another music crew, led by Benny Baker, Ma Baker's son. Later at a launch party for Asia Blue, Benny's girlfriend, Sunny and Rose meet. When Ma Baker finds out her daughter is seeing Sunny, she goes to visit him, and gives him a coat once owned by his father, Johnny Cool. Upon asking his mother about it, Pearl explains how Ma Baker was Johnny's dance partner—and took her away from her when she was pregnant with him.

Act II
After a music battle between the Subsonics and the Blades, Shake is shot by Benny, but when Sunny gets the opportunity to get payback, he does not take it, instantly being disowned by the Subsonics, and subsequently breaking up with Rose. Rasputin tells him to make it up with Rose, but he is arrested, accused of shooting Shake, as Benny and Ma have set him up.

As the Notting Hill Carnival takes place, Shake, Rose, Asia, and Sunny appear. It is revealed that someone has given evidence against Benny over the shooting—Benny's best friend, Naz.

Musical numbers 

Act I
"Hooray! Hooray! It's a Holi-Holiday" (Boney M.) – Ensemble, Young Sunny, Janet, Zadie
"Mary's Boy Child" (Boney M.) – Pastor, Choir, Young Sunny, Ensemble
"Girl You Know It's True" (Milli Vanilli) – The Subsonics
"Take the Heat off Me" (Boney M.) – Ma Baker, Asia Blue, Janet, Ensemble
"Ma Baker" (Boney M.) – Rose, Sandra
"Sweet Dreams" (La Bouche) – Asia Blue, Ensemble
"Be My Lover" (La Bouche) – Asia Blue, Ensemble
"Baby Don't Forget My Number" (Milli Vanilli) – Sunny, Rose
"Brown Girl in the Ring" (Boney M.) – Sunny, Janet, Ensemble
"Sunny" (Boney M.) – Rose, Ensemble
"Baby Do You Wanna Bump" (Boney M.) – Ensemble
"Daddy Cool" (Boney M.) – Janet, Ensemble
One Way Ticket (Eruption) – Young Pearl

Act II
"Rasputin" (Boney M.) – Ezra & Alani
"Gotta Go Home" (Boney M.) – The Blade Squad
"Painter Man" (Boney M.) – The Subsonics
"Brown Girl in the Ring" (Boney M.) – The Blade Squad, Asia Blue
"Rasputin" (Boney M.) – The Subsonics
"Girl I'm Gonna Miss You" (Milli Vanilli) – Rose, Sunny
"I Can't Stand The Rain" (Eruption/Ann Peebles) – Pearl
"Where Do You Go" (La Bouche/No Mercy) – Benny, The Blade Squad
"Got a Man on My Mind" (Boney M.) – Ma Baker
"Blame It on the Rain" (Milli Vanilli) – Rasputin, Janet, Ensemble
"When I Die" (No Mercy) – Sunny, Rose
"Calendar Song" (Boney M.) – Ezra, Alani, Janet & Ensemble
"Let It All Be Music" (Boney M.) – Sunny, Rose, Shake, Asia, Pearl, Janet & Ensemble
"Rivers of Babylon" (Boney M.) – Ensemble

Changes during production 
The carnival scene used to include more dialogue between the Subsonics, but was replaced with "The Calendar Song"
For the first few weeks of the show, it was not Naz who gave evidence against Benny, but Asia.
The parrot hanging above the audience used to be brought down during the finale, but now it is not.
There used to be a big scene where the beatboxer from the subsonics suddenly started beatboxing on a bench and the other people from the subsonics started rapping but now they cut that out.

Original London cast 
In order of appearance:
Grandma Ella – Hope Augustus
Zadie – Alani Gibbon
Young Sunny – Dion Laughton or Khai Shaw
Janet – Darvina Plante
Pearl – Melanie La Barrie
Pastor Brown – Larrington Walker
Sunny – Dwayne Wint
Flow – Richard Francis (Lianhart)
Shake – Harvey
Isis – Helen Kurup
G-Dog – Duane O'Garro
Rasputin – Donovan F. Blackwood
Benny – Davie Fairbanks
Dex – Marc Small
Naz – Ricky Norwood
Marvin – Elliot Treend
Hype – Page
Ma Baker – Michelle Collins (until 6 January 2007)
Asia Blue – Javine
Sandra – Shelley Williams
Rose – Camilla Beeput
Johnny Cool – Emmanuel Sonubi
Young Pearl – Shelley Williams
Young Margaret – Maria Swainson
Dancer 1 – Devina Eyesha

Original London cast album
The original London cast recording was released on 12 April 2007 on SonyBMG Records.  It is currently only available to buy through Amazon Germany and Amazon UK.  It was recorded in studios during September 2006.

References

External links 
Official Daddy Cool website
Synopsis and song list at guidetomusicaltheatre.com
Interview with Harvey on Theatre.com
Russian Unofficial DADDY COOL website
Frank Farian Official Website
Frank Farian Fansite
 
 

Jukebox musicals
2006 musicals
Boney M.
West End musicals